Elaine Devry (born Thelma Elaine Mahnken) is an American actress.

Early life
Devry was born Thelma Elaine Mahnken to Fred P. and Hortense Mahnken in Compton, California, where she was raised. Her brother, Jeff, was three years her senior. She began to model at age fifteen. She graduated from Compton High School and later attended Compton Junior College, where she was homecoming queen.

After marrying her high school boyfriend, Dan Ducich, in 1948, the couple lived in Butte, Montana, until their 1952 divorce, upon which Devry returned to California, working as a carhop at the Dolores Drive-In on Wilshire Boulevard.

Career
She was billed as Elaine Davis in her early acting roles, including her first film, The Atomic Kid, in which she and Rooney co-starred. She appeared in films such as China Doll (1958) and A Guide for the Married Man (1967). Devry made three guest appearances on Perry Mason, including the title role of defendant Janice Wainwright in the 1962 episode "The Case of the Shapely Shadow." That same year, she appeared with actor John Clarke in a commercial for Kool cigarettes.

She also appeared in many television series, including Death Valley Days in the episode "Yankee Confederate" with Tod Andrews, Bonanza in the episode "The Search", 77 Sunset Strip, Burke's Law, Family Affair, I Dream of Jeannie, Marcus Welby, M.D., Dragnet, and Tales of Wells Fargo. She appeared on My Three Sons on season 10, episode 1 as Millicent Sawyer, a single woman who was set up on a date with Steven Douglas by his daughter-in-law Katie, but instead he meets Barbara and falls in love.

Personal life
Devry married Dan Ducich, her high school boyfriend, in Butte, Montana, in September 1948. The following year, Ducich was convicted of multiple robberies in Los Angeles and sentenced to five years' probation. The couple resided in Butte, but divorced in 1952. She also had a six-year marriage to actor Mickey Rooney, whom she met in 1952, and married on November 15, 1952, in Las Vegas. The couple had a son and a daughter and divorced in 1958. Speaking in 1967, Devry said that although she liked Rooney "very much", she was still in love with her first husband, but that he did not care. She thought in time that she could "learn to love him", but that she was "young and foolish" and by the end, had enough. Following her eight years of marriage, she expressed to being "marriage shy", despite numerous proposals from other actors but that she was "afraid to take the chance". Despite claims from Rooney that she received a $125,000 mansion, a summer home and a 10-year annual $21,000 alimony in divorce settlement, she disputed the claim, saying that she instead received a $75,000 studio home with a $45,000 mortgage, a summer home and that the alimony was only $21,000 in the first year.

She was married to actor Will J White until his death on April 23, 1992 in Grants Pass, Oregon. Since 2005, Devry has lived on a ranch in Oregon.

Filmography

References

External links
 

Living people
American film actresses
Actresses from Los Angeles
Compton High School alumni
People from Compton, California
21st-century American women
Year of birth missing (living people)